The Fairmount–Southside Historic District is a  historic district (United States) that has been listed on the National Register of Historic Places since 1990.

Structures in the district represent Late 19th and Early 20th Century American Movements architecture, Late 19th and 20th Century Revivals architecture, and Late Victorian architecture.

It includes the Meredith Benton House, the Johnson-Elliott House, and the South Side Masonic Lodge No. 1114 which were previously listed on the NRHP. The Benton House and Masonic Lodge are Recorded Texas Historic Landmarks along with the Grammer-Pierce House, the Gunhild Weber House, and the William Reeves House.

The listing includes 1,013 contributing buildings and one other contributing structure.

It is asserted to be the largest historic district designated in the southwestern United States.

The webpage title for the entity describes itself as "Fairmount National Historic District", while the webpage itself names it "Fairmount Historic District".

Photo gallery

See also

National Register of Historic Places listings in Tarrant County, Texas
Recorded Texas Historic Landmarks in Tarrant County

References

External links

National Register of Historic Places in Fort Worth, Texas
Historic districts in Fort Worth, Texas
Victorian architecture in Texas
Historic districts on the National Register of Historic Places in Texas